Zélée Glacier is a glacier about  wide and  long, flowing north-northwest from the continental ice along the west side of Lacroix Nunatak and terminating in a prominent tongue at the west side of Port Martin. Probably first sighted in 1840 by the French expedition under Captain Jules Dumont d'Urville, although no glaciers were noted on d'Urville's chart of this coast. Photographed from the air by U.S. Navy Operation Highjump, 1946–47. Charted by the French Antarctic Expedition under Liotard, 1949–51, and named for the Zélée, corvette which accompanied d'Urville's flagship, the Astrolabe.

Delineated from air photos taken by U.S. Navy Operation Highjump, 1946–47, and named for the French corvette Zélée.

See also
 List of glaciers in the Antarctic
 Glaciology

References

 
 

Glaciers of Adélie Land